Mauricio Hernández Rizo (born 22 May 1993) is a Mexican professional footballer who plays as a midfielder for Alacranes de Durango.

External links
 

Liga MX players
Living people
Mexican footballers
1993 births
Footballers from Guadalajara, Jalisco

Association football midfielders
Inter Playa del Carmen players
Coras de Nayarit F.C. footballers
La Piedad footballers
Alacranes de Durango footballers